Ha'ir (lit The City) is a weekly local newspaper published in Tel Aviv, Israel. The tabloid-sized newspaper was first published in October 1980. Since April 2005 when there was a major shakeup in the business structure of newspaper's publisher, Schocken Group, it has been distributed for free.

Ha'ir is published on a Thursday evening, and is distributed throughout the metropolitan area of Tel Aviv through newspaper stands.

One of Ha'ir'''s supplements is Akhbar Ha'ir (lit. City Mouse''), a Tel Aviv entertainment guide.

In December 2009, distribution of Ha'ir was stopped to residents of Holon and Petah Tikva after research with focus groups found that residents are not interested in the content that is seen as more relevant to Tel Avivians.

See also
List of Israeli newspapers

References

Publications established in 1980
Weekly newspapers published in Israel
Hebrew-language newspapers
Mass media in Tel Aviv